Simone Minelli (born 8 January 1997) is an Italian footballer who plays as a forward for Serie D club Athletic Carpi.

Club career

Fiorentina 
Minelli is a youth exponent from ACF Fiorentina. He made his senior debut on 11 December 2014 against FC Dinamo Minsk in a UEFA Europa League game. He replaced Juan Cuadrado after 24 minutes, and also provided an assist to Marko Marin's goal in a 1–2 home defeat.

Loan to AlbinoLeffe 
On 30 August 2016, Minelli was signed by Serie C side Albinoleffe on a season-long loan deal. Four days later, on 3 September, he made his league debut for AlbinoLeffe as a substitute replacing Ferdinando Mastroianni in the 86th minute of a 1–1 away draw against Calcio Padova and ten more days later, on 13 September, Minelli played his first entire match for the club, a 2–2 away draw against Forlì. Minelli ended his season-long loan to AlbinoLeffe with 26 appearances, playing only 7 as a starter and including only 2 entire matches and playing 19 times as a substitute and remaining an unused substitute for 6 other matches.

Loan to Trapani 
On 20 July 2017, Minelli was loaned to Serie C club Trapani on a season-long loan deal. Five weeks later, on 26 August, he made his Serie C debut for the club as a substitute replacing Manuel Marras in the 74th minute of a 1–0 home win over Siracusa and five more weeks later, on 30 September, he scored his first professional goal, as a substitute, in the 63rd minute of a 2–1 home win over Casertana. On 21 January 2018, Minelli was sent-off, as a substitute, a red card in the 93rd minute of a 1–0 away defeat against Sicula Leonzio. Minelli ended his season-long loan to Trapani with 17 appearances, including only 1 as a starter, and scoring 1 goal.

Teramo 
On 1 August 2019, Minelli joined Serie C club Teramo on a free-transfer and he signed a 3-year contract. On 24 November he made his debut for the club as a substitute replacing Simone Magnaghi after 80 minutes of a 1–1 away draw against Bari. In his first season at Teramo he made only 9 appearances, all of them as a substitute. He did not make any appearances in the 2020–21 season as he was injured for the most of it. On 3 August 2021, his contract with Teramo was terminated by mutual consent.

Athletic Carpi 
On 15 September 2021, he joined Athletic Carpi in Serie D.

Career statistics

Club

Honours

International 
Italy U19

 UEFA European Under-19 Championship runner-up: 2016

References

1997 births
Sportspeople from Carpi, Emilia-Romagna
Living people
Italian footballers
Association football midfielders
ACF Fiorentina players
U.C. AlbinoLeffe players
Trapani Calcio players
S.S. Teramo Calcio players
Serie C players
Serie D players
Footballers from Emilia-Romagna